Fredericka Carolyn "Fredi" Washington (December 23, 1903 – June 28, 1994) was an American stage and film actress, civil rights activist, performer, and writer. Washington was of African-American descent. She was one of the first black Americans to gain recognition for film and stage work in the 1920s and 1930s.

Washington was active in the Harlem Renaissance (1920s–1930s), her best known role being Peola in the 1934 film version of Imitation of Life, where she plays a young light-skinned woman who decides to pass as white. Her last film role was in One Mile from Heaven (1937), after which she left Hollywood and returned to New York to work in theatre and civil rights activism.

Early life
Fredi Washington was born in 1903 in Savannah, Georgia, to Robert T. Washington, a postal worker, and Harriet "Hattie" Walker Ward, a dancer. Both were of African-American and European ancestry. Fredi was the second of their five children. Her mother died when Fredi was 11 years old. As the oldest girl in her family, she helped raise her younger siblings, Isabel, Rosebud and Robert, with the help of their grandmother. After their mother's death, Fredi and her sister Isabel were sent to the St. Elizabeth's Convent School for Colored Girls in Cornwells Heights, near Philadelphia, Pennsylvania. Her father eventually remarried, but his second wife died while pregnant with the couple's first child. He married a third time and had four additional children, giving the family a total of nine children.

While still in school in Philadelphia, Washington's family moved north to Harlem, New York during the "Great Migration." Washington graduated from Julia Richman High School in New York City.

Career

Early entertainment career
Washington's entertainment career began in 1921 as a chorus girl in the Broadway musical Shuffle Along. She was hired by dancer Josephine Baker as a member of the "Happy Honeysuckles," a cabaret group. Baker became a friend and mentor to her. Washington's collaboration with Baker led to her being discovered by producer Lee Shubert. In 1926, she was recommended for a co-starring role on the Broadway stage with Paul Robeson in the play Black Boy. She quickly became a popular, featured dancer, and toured internationally with her dancing partner, Al Moiret.

Washington turned to acting in the late 1920s. Her first movie role was in Black and Tan (1929), in which she played a Cotton Club dancer who was dying. She acted in a small role in The Emperor Jones (1933) starring Robeson. Washington played Cab Calloway's love interest in the musical short Cab Calloway's Hi-De-Ho (1934).

Imitation of Life 
Her best-known role was in the 1934 movie Imitation of Life. Washington played a young, light-skinned black woman who chose to pass as white to seek more opportunities in a society restricted by legal racial segregation in some states and social discrimination in others. As Washington had visible European ancestry, the role was considered perfect for her, but it led to her being typecast by filmmakers. Moviegoers sometimes assumed from Washington's appearance—her blue-gray eyes, pale complexion, and light brown hair—that she might have passed in real life. In 1934 she said the role did not reflect her off-screen life, but "If I made Peola seem real enough to merit such statements, I consider such statements compliments and makes me feel I've done my job fairly well." She told reporters in 1949 that she identified as black "...because I'm honest, firstly, and secondly, you don't have to be white to be good. I've spent most of my life trying to prove to those who think otherwise ... I am a Negro and I am proud of it."

Imitation of Life was nominated for an Academy Award for Best Picture, but it did not win. Years later, in 2007, Time magazine ranked it as among "The 25 Most Important Films on Race."

Activism 
Washington's experiences in the film industry and theater led her to become a civil rights activist. In an effort to help other black actors and actresses find more opportunities, in 1937 Washington co-founded the Negro Actors Guild of America (NAG), with Noble Sissle, W. C. Handy, Paul Robeson, and Ethel Waters. The organization's mission included speaking out against stereotyping and advocating for a wider range of roles. Washington served as the organization's first executive secretary.

Later work
Washington played opposite Bill Robinson in Fox's One Mile from Heaven (1937), in which she played a biracial woman claiming to be the mother of a "white" baby. Claire Trevor plays a reporter who discovers the story and helps both Washington and the white biological mother who had given up the baby, played by Sally Blane. According to the Museum of Modern Art in 2013: "The last of the six Claire Trevor 'snappy' vehicles [Allan] Dwan made for Fox in the 1930s tests the limits of free expression on race in Hollywood while sometimes straining credulity."

Washington appeared in the 1939 Broadway production of Mamba's Daughters, along with Ethel Waters and Georgette Harvey. She later became a casting consultant for the stage productions of Carmen Jones (1943) and George Gershwin's Porgy and Bess.

Leaves Hollywood for radio
Despite receiving critical acclaim, she was unable to find much work in the Hollywood of the 1930s and 1940s; black actresses were expected to have dark skin, and were usually typecast as maids. Directors were concerned about casting a light-skinned black actress in a romantic role with a white leading man; the film production code prohibited suggestions of miscegenation. Hollywood directors did not offer her any romantic roles. As one modern critic explained, Fredi Washington was "...too beautiful and not dark enough to play maids, but rather too light to act in all-black movies..."

Washington had a dramatic role in a 1943 radio tribute to black women, Heroines in Bronze, produced by the National Urban League, but there were few regular dramatic radio programs in that era with black protagonists. Washington wrote an opinion piece for the black press in which she discussed how limited the opportunities in broadcasting were for black actors, actresses, and vocalists, writing that "...radio seems to keep its doors sealed [against] colored artists."

In 1945 she said:
"You see I'm a mighty proud gal, and I can't for the life of me find any valid reason why anyone should lie about their origin, or anything else for that matter. Frankly, I do not ascribe to the stupid theory of white supremacy and to try to hide the fact that I am a Negro for economic or any other reasons. If I do, I would be agreeing to be a Negro makes me inferior and that I have swallowed whole hog all of the propaganda dished out by our fascist-minded white citizens."

Writer
Washington was a theater writer, and the entertainment editor for People's Voice (published 1942–1948), a newspaper for African Americans founded by Adam Clayton Powell, Jr., a Baptist minister and politician in New York City who was married to her sister Isabel Washington Powell. She was outspoken about racism faced by African Americans and worked closely with Walter White, then president of the NAACP, to address pressing issues facing black people in America.

Personal life
In 1933, Washington married Lawrence Brown, the trombonist in Duke Ellington's jazz orchestra. That marriage ended in divorce. In 1952, Washington married a Stamford dentist, Hugh Anthony Bell, and moved to Greenwich, Connecticut. 

She was a devout Catholic.

Death 
Fredi Washington Bell died, aged 90, on June 28, 1994. She died from pneumonia following a series of strokes at St. Joseph Medical Center in Stamford, Connecticut.

Legacy and honors
In 1975, Washington was inducted into the Black Filmmakers Hall of Fame.
In 1979, Washington received the CIRCA Award for lifetime achievement in the performing arts.
In 1981, Washington received an award from the Audience Development Company (AUDELCO), a New York-based nonprofit group devoted to preserving and promoting African-American theater.

Filmography
Black and Tan (1929)
The Emperor Jones (1933)
Imitation of Life (1934)
Ouanga (1936)
One Mile from Heaven (1937)

References

External links

The People's Voice Research and Editorial Files (1865-1963) are available for research use at the Historical Society of Pennsylvania.
Erin Blakemore, "The Fair-Skinned Black Actress Who Refused to 'Pass' in 1930s Hollywood", History, January 26, 2021.

1903 births
1994 deaths
20th-century African-American people
20th-century African-American women
Actors from Savannah, Georgia
Actresses from Georgia (U.S. state)
African-American actresses
African-American Catholics
American film actresses
Catholics from Connecticut
Catholics from Georgia (U.S. state)
Deaths from pneumonia in Connecticut